Some Soviet prisoners of war who survived German captivity during World War II were accused by the Soviet authorities of collaboration with the Nazis or branded as traitors under Order No. 270, which prohibited any soldier from surrendering.

Overview
During and after World War II freed POWs went to special "filtration camps" run by the NKVD. Of these, by 1944, more than 90% were cleared, and about 8% were arrested or condemned to serve in penal battalions. In 1944, they were sent directly to reserve military formations to be cleared by the NKVD. Further, in 1945, about 100 filtration camps were set for repatriated Ostarbeiter, POWs, and other displaced persons, which processed more than 4,000,000 people. By 1946, 80% civilians and 20% of POWs were freed, 5% of civilians, and 43% of POWs were re-drafted, 10% of civilians and 22% of POWs were sent to labor battalions, and 2% of civilians and 15% of the POWs (226,127 out of 1,539,475 total) were transferred to the NKVD, i.e. the Gulag.

Russian historian G.F. Krivosheev gives slightly different numbers based on documents provided by the KGB: 233,400 were found guilty of collaborating with the enemy and sent to Gulag camps out of 1,836,562 Soviet soldiers who returned from captivity. Latter data do not include millions of civilians who have been repatriated (often involuntarily) to the Soviet Union, and a significant number of whom were also sent to the Gulag or executed (e.g. Betrayal of the Cossacks). The survivors were released during the general amnesty for all POWs and accused collaborators in 1955 on the wave of De-Stalinization following Stalin's death in 1953.

While many scholars agree that de-classified Soviet archive data is a reliable source, Rolf-Dieter Müller and Gerd R. Ueberschär claimed "Soviet historians engaged for the most part in a disinformation campaign about the extent of the prisoner-of-war problem."  and claimed that almost all returning POWs were convicted of collaboration and treason hence sentenced to the various forms of forced labour, while admitting that it would be unlikely to study the full extent of the history of the Soviet prisoners of war. Thousands of Soviet POWs indeed survived through collaboration, many of them joining German forces, including the SS formations.

See also
German mistreatment of Soviet prisoners of war
Operation Keelhaul
Repatriation of Cossacks after World War II

References

Aftermath of World War II in the Soviet Union
Political repression in the Soviet Union
Soviet prisoners of war